The 1930 Regis Rangers football team was an American football team that represented Regis College as an independent during the 1930 college football season. In their third season under head coach Red Strader, the Rangers compiled a 6–3 record and outscored opponents by a total of 159 to 121.

Schedule

References

Regis
Regis Rangers football seasons
Regis Rangers football